Chris Edgerly (born August 6, 1969) is an American voice actor, comedian and singer.

Life and career 

Edgerly provided the voice of Peter Potamus on the Adult Swim animated series Harvey Birdman, Attorney at Law, in addition to several guest voices on the TV series Drawn Together. Other television voice appearances include Duck Dodgers, My Gym Partner's a Monkey, Codename: Kids Next Door, and Kenan & Kel. He can also be heard as the voice of "Cloak" in the Disney animated feature The Wild. In 2006, Edgerly started voicing Nick Diamond, The Masked Man and referee Mills Lane on the return of MTV's Celebrity Deathmatch. He also provided a voice for a Brute in the video game Halo 2 and Pathfinder in Apex Legends and appeared on two episodes of Kenan & Kel.

Edgerly lent his voice to Yuan, Magnius, and Kvar in the video game Tales of Symphonia. He has also voiced Cid Highwind in the film Final Fantasy VII Advent Children, as well as the video games Kingdom Hearts II, Lineage II, and Dirge of Cerberus: Final Fantasy VII; voiced The Flash in the 2006 video game Justice League Heroes; and voiced the character of Sullivan in Resonance of Fate.

He recently voiced Pathfinder in the game Apex Legends. He has voiced various soldiers in the video game Valkyria Chronicles and TEL in Infinity Blade III. He voiced the protagonist character Ken Ogawa in FromSoftware's video game Ninja Blade. He also provided the voice of Gambit in the video game adaption of X-Men Origins: Wolverine as well as voicing different characters in the 2012 video game, Lego The Lord of the Rings. He also voiced Peter Parker, J. Jonah Jameson, and Spider-Man in The Amazing Adventures of Spider-Man. Additionally, he voices Hidan in Naruto: Shippuden. Edgerly played the voice of Jedi Master Eeth Koth for the animated series Star Wars: The Clone Wars in the second season episode "Grievous Intrigue".

He became a cast member for The Simpsons, playing various characters. He also voiced Ren Hoek in the 2011 game Nicktoons MLB. In 2013, Edgerly took the role of a spiky winged creature called a pufferthorn, and his character was named Pop Thorn, in Skylanders: Swap Force. Edgerly also has provided the voice of Gobber the Belch on Cartoon Network's DreamWorks Dragons animated series for seasons 1 and 2. He has continued to do so for its third season that aired on Netflix in 2015.

Edgerly was one of the two main voice actors in the English release of Top Cat: The Movie.

Filmography

Animation 

 Codename: Kids Next Door – Additional Voices
 Baki – Ryuko Yanagi (English dub) others
 Digimon Data Squad – Additional Voices (English dub)
 Naruto Shippūden – Hidan (English dub)
 Ultraman – Yosuke Endo, others (English dub)
 Godzilla Singular Point — Additional Voices (English Dub)

Film

Video games 

 Alpha Protocol – Sergei Surkov
 Assassin's Creed II – Additional Voices
 Assassin's Creed: Brotherhood – Additional Voices
 James Cameron's Avatar: The Game – Able Ryder (Male)
 Baten Kaitos Origins – Elder Kamroh, Rodolfo
 Brütal Legend – Glamhogs, Thunderhogs
 Call of Duty 4: Modern Warfare – Marine Soldier #3, SAS Soldier, US Pilot
 Call of Duty: Finest Hour – Additional Voices
 Call of Duty: World at War – Final Fronts – Additional Voices
 Cars 2 – Additional Voices
 Cars Race-O-Rama – Additional Voices
 The Darkness – Chester Coleman, Melvin Caines, Silvio Leatherchest
 Diablo III – Additional Voices
 Diablo III: Reaper of Souls – Additional Voices
 Disney Infinity 3.0 – Yondu
 Disney Infinity: Marvel Super Heroes – Yondu
 Disney Princess: My Fairytale Adventure – Scuttle
 Disney's Planes – Additional Voices
 Dragon Age: Origins – Additional Voices
 DuckTales: Remastered – Gyro Gearloose
 EverQuest II – Additional Voices
 Final Fantasy XIII – Cocoon Inhabitants (English Dub)
 Fortnite – Llama Prize
 Gears of War 3 – Sailor #1, Stranded Guard
 The Godfather II – Additional Voices
 Ground Control II: Operation Exodus – Captain Jacob Angelus, Unit Feedback
 Halo 2 – Brute
 Halo 3 – Grunt
 Halo: Reach – Grunt #1
 Happy Feet – Elder Penguins, Humans
 Hitman: Absolution – Additional voices
 How to Train Your Dragon – Gobber
 The Incredibles – Additional Voices
 inFamous – Pedestrian
 Infinity Blade III – TEL
 Iron Brigade – Claude
 Jet Li: Rise to Honour – Additional Voices
 Key of Heaven – Muzo
 Lego The Lord of the Rings – Aragorn (sound effects)
 Lightning Returns: Final Fantasy XIII – Additional Voices (English Dub)
 The Lord of the Rings: Aragorn's Quest – Éomer, Additional Voices
 The Lord of the Rings: The Battle for Middle-earth – Aragorn, Éomer
 The Lord of the Rings: The Battle for Middle-earth II – Aragorn, Éomer
 The Lord of the Rings: The Battle for Middle-earth II: The Rise of the Witch King – Aragorn, Éomer
 The Lord of the Rings: The Third Age – Elegost
 The Lord of the Rings: War in the North – Aragorn
 Mass Effect – Captain Ventralis, Cole, Powell
 Mass Effect 2 – Etarn Tiron, Additional Voices
 Mass Effect 3 – Additional Voices
 Maximo vs. Army of Zin – Grim, Bandit, Morgan's Guard
 Medal of Honor: Pacific Assault – Additional Voices
 Naruto Shippuden: Ultimate Ninja Heroes 3 – Anbu, Hidan, Prisoner (English Dub)
 Naruto Shippūden: Ultimate Ninja Storm 2 – Hidan (English Dub)
 Naruto Shippūden: Ultimate Ninja Storm 4 – Hidan and Roshi (English Dub)
 Naruto Shippūden: Ultimate Ninja Storm Revolution – Hidan and Roshi (English Dub)
 Ninja Blade – Ken Ogawa
 The Polar Express – Additional Voices
 Project: Snowblind – Lt. Col. Kanazawa
 The Punisher – Additional Voices
 Ratchet & Clank Future: A Crack in Time – Terachnoid #2
 Resistance 2 – Additional Voices
 Resistance: Fall of Man – Additional Voices
 * The Saboteur – Renard
 Skylanders: SuperChargers – Pop Thorn
 Skylanders: Swap Force – Pop Thorn
 Skylanders: Trap Team – Pop Thorn
 Spider-Man: Shattered Dimensions – Spider-Ham, Additional Voices
 Star Wars: Clone Wars Adventures – Eeth Koth
 SWAT 4: The Stetchkov Syndicate – SWAT Officer Zack "Hollywood" Fields
 Terminator Salvation – Resistance Soldiers
 Tom Clancy's Ghost Recon: Advanced Warfighter – Additional Voices
 Tom Clancy's Ghost Recon: Advanced Warfighter 2 – Additional Voices
 Transformers: Revenge of the Fallen – Additional Voices
 Valkyria Chronicles – Additional Voices

Theme parks 
 The Amazing Adventures of Spider-Man – Peter Parker / Spider-Man, J. Jonah Jameson
 Dumbo the Flying Elephant – Timothy Q. Mouse
 The Little Mermaid: Ariel's Undersea Adventure – Scuttle

References

External links 
 
 

1969 births
Living people
American stand-up comedians
American male video game actors
American male voice actors
People from Silver Spring, Maryland
21st-century American comedians